Arne Hjalmar Sigvard Johansson (25 February 1915 – 12 October 1956) was a Swedish ice hockey player. He competed in the men's tournament at the 1948 Winter Olympics.

References

External links
 

1915 births
1956 deaths
Ice hockey players at the 1948 Winter Olympics
Olympic ice hockey players of Sweden
Sportspeople from Uppsala
20th-century Swedish people